Jue Chen is a Chinese-born American structural biologist and biochemist. She is the William E. Ford professor of biochemistry and head of the Laboratory of Membrane Biology and Biophysics at the Rockefeller University and a Howard Hughes Medical Institute investigator. Her research focuses on elucidating the structure and function of ATP-binding cassette (ABC) transporters.

Early life and education 
Chen was born in Changsha, China and graduated from Changsha No. 1 High School in 1988. She studied at Tongji University in Shanghai before moving to the United States.

She earned a bachelor's degree in chemistry from Ohio University in 1993, and went on to pursue PhD in biochemistry from Harvard University in 1998 under the mentorship of Don C. Wiley, where she discovered unique structural features of the influenza virus responsible for infection

Career and research 
Chen remained in Don C. Wiley's lab as a postdoctoral researcher before moving on to a postdoctoral fellowship at Baylor College of Medicine from 1999 to 2001 in the lab of Florante A. Quiocho, where she started studying the ATP binding cassette transporters

In 2002, Chen became an assistant professor at Purdue University where she won a number of teaching awards and published her research in high impact journals. In 2007, Chen was promoted to associate professor and subsequently, professor in 2011. In 2003 she was named a Pew Scholar and a Howard Hughes Medical Institute Investigator in 2008  In 2014, she moved to The Rockefeller University, where she is now the William E. Ford Professor and Head of Laboratory of Membrane Biology and Biophysics.

Her work on ABC transporters includes investigating their role in resistance to chemotherapy drugs; antigen presentation in adaptive immunity and viral infection; cystic fibrosis; and bacterial nutrition.

In 2019, she was elected to the National Academy of Sciences.

Awards and honors 
 Pew Scholar (2003) 
 Anatrace Membrane Protein Award, Biophysical Society (2018)
 US National Academy of Sciences (2019)

References 

Rockefeller University faculty
Ohio University alumni
Howard Hughes Medical Investigators
Purdue University faculty
American women biochemists
Harvard University alumni
21st-century American biologists
21st-century American women scientists
Year of birth missing (living people)
Living people
Chemists from Hunan
People from Changsha
Chinese biochemists
Chinese women chemists
Chinese emigrants to the United States
Tongji University alumni
Educators from Hunan
Biologists from Hunan